Local elections in England and Wales were held on 6 May 2021 for more than 145 English local councils for around 5,000 seats (including by-elections), thirteen directly elected mayors in England, and 39 police and crime commissioners in England and Wales. There were also elections to the Scottish Parliament (129 seats), Senedd (Welsh Parliament) (60 seats) and London Assembly (25 seats), the last in conjunction with the London mayoral election. Also on the same day as these local elections, there was a UK Parliament by-election for the constituency of Hartlepool.

In March 2020, the government announced that the elections scheduled for 7 May 2020 would be delayed for a year due to the COVID-19 pandemic. They were now held at the same time as the elections previously scheduled for 2021. The seats up for election were those last contested in 2016 and 2017. New unitary authorities to replace the county and district councils in Northamptonshire and Buckinghamshire held their inaugural elections this year.

The Conservative Party made significant gains in the elections; despite initial predictions that the party would perform better in the seats last contested in 2016, but worse in the ones contested in 2017 (when the party benefited from the then-exceptionally high approval ratings of Theresa May's government in the run-up to that year's general election), they in fact performed even better in both sets of seats, with their performance being widely attributed to the successful rollout of the country's COVID-19 vaccination programme. By contrast, Labour's poor performance was generally ascribed to the party still being viewed by much of the working class as having been discredited by its prior opposition to Brexit, as well as party leader Keir Starmer's perceived opportunism in attacking Prime Minister Boris Johnson over the Downing Street refurbishment controversy. The Liberal Democrats made some minor gains despite a loss in their popular vote share, while the Green Party made more substantial gains.

Overall

Background
The local elections in May 2019 across a majority of councils in England saw the Conservative Party suffer significant losses to the Liberal Democrats, who regained councils they lost to the Conservatives in 2015. The Labour Party, despite making some gains, had a net loss of over eighty seats in areas that had traditionally voted for them, particularly to independent candidates. Local elections also took place at the same time in Northern Ireland, which saw a rise in the Alliance Party's representation across the region. At the 2019 European Parliament election, a few weeks later, the Conservatives had their lowest share of the vote in a nationwide election in their history, with the Brexit Party and the Liberal Democrats coming first and second, respectively.

On 12 December 2019, the UK held a snap general election that led to the Conservatives winning a majority of eighty in the House of Commons, while Labour had their worst share of the seats since the 1935 general election. Following the election result, Jeremy Corbyn announced that he would step down as leader of the Labour Party; Keir Starmer was elected the new leader on 4 April 2020. The Liberal Democrats also held a leadership election after Jo Swinson lost her seat in the general election; in the interim, the party's deputy leader Ed Davey and party president Mark Pack acted as co-leaders, and in August Davey was elected as leader.

Prior to the elections, structural changes to local government in England merged some district and county councils into unitary authorities, which meant more power was consolidated; an example is Buckinghamshire Council, which replaced five councils in April 2020. In addition, new combined authorities (institutions which cover two or more local authorities) are being created, with the electorate of the West Yorkshire Combined Authority electing their mayor at this election. Intentions to reorganise councils in Cumbria, North Yorkshire and Somerset caused elections in those areas to be rescheduled for 2022. More combined authorities and significant reorganisations were planned, but in 2020 the COVID-19 pandemic slowed down the government's devolution program for England.

Postponement to 2021 
A pandemic of a new strand of coronavirus spread across the world from February 2020. On 1 March, Health Secretary Matt Hancock issued a warning that "all options" were being considered if the virus spread further, including delaying the local elections, for the first time since the 2001 elections which were delayed by a month due to the foot-and-mouth outbreak. On 12 March, the Association of Electoral Administrators asked the government to consider postponing the elections should the situation in the UK deteriorate. The same day, the Electoral Commission recommended that the elections be delayed till the autumn.

A day later, Prime Minister Boris Johnson decided to postpone the 2020 UK local elections until May 2021. This decision was legislated for in the Coronavirus Act 2020, which was enacted on 25 March. The bill gave the government the power to postpone any elections, including by-elections, which would otherwise have been held between the dates of 16 March 2020 and 5 May 2021. To preserve the four-year electoral cycle, those elected in 2021 would serve three-year terms.

On 4 November 2020, the Cabinet Office ruled out any further delays to local elections, after suggestions from some local authorities to defer the elections by a couple of weeks, in order to allow enough time to get the electoral roll in order without having to knock on doors during the second wave of the pandemic. After the country went into a third national lockdown in January 2021, the County Councils Network called on Johnson to declare "as soon as possible" whether the elections would go ahead as planned. Suggestions had been put forward include delaying the elections until June or July; delaying them until the Autumn; and conducting them in May but entirely via postal voting. On 9 January election officials stated that the local elections will take place as planned. However Johnson said this remains "under review". It was confirmed in February by Chloe Smith and the Cabinet Office that the elections would in fact take place in line with the government's target to vaccinate all over 50s by the beginning of May.

By-elections 
The Coronavirus Act 2020 also postponed by-elections to fill casual vacancies occurring because a sitting councillor resigned or died. On 15 March 2021, it was reported that more than 260 by-elections would take place alongside the planned council elections.

In Bournemouth, Christchurch and Poole, by-elections were held in the wards of Canford Heath and Commons. Four by-elections in the London Borough of Lewisham were also held.

Restrictions on campaigns 
In January 2021, government guidance on activity during the national lockdown was issued by the Minister of State for the Constitution and Devolution, Chloe Smith, stating that door-to-door campaigning or leafleting by individual political party activists was not possible under the restriction "You must not leave, or be outside of your home except where necessary". Labour suspended leafleting and urged other parties to do the same, but the Liberal Democrats' leader Ed Davey defended the party's leafleting activities, arguing that the party had taken legal advice and that leafleting was allowed under an exemption for volunteer organisations. Rights and democracy groups criticised the restrictions on campaigning, claiming that there was no leafleting ban in the coronavirus regulations and raising concerns it could interfere with the right to free expression and the functioning of democracy.

On 26 February, the UK government said the restrictions in England would be changed to allow door-to-door campaigns from 8 March, and that similar guidance would be published by the Welsh and Scottish governments. Campaigners would be able to deliver leaflets and speak to electors on their doorsteps.

Campaign
Going into the short campaign period, the Conservative Party started to develop a 6–7% poll lead on the Labour Party.

On Thursday 11 March, Labour launched its local election campaign, with the party's leader Keir Starmer, deputy leader Angela Rayner, Mayor of London Sadiq Khan, First Minister of Wales Mark Drakeford, Scottish Labour leader Anas Sarwar and West Yorkshire metro-mayor candidate Tracy Brabin as speakers. The party focused its election priorities on giving nurses a pay rise.

Following the death of Prince Philip, Duke of Edinburgh, political parties halted campaigning for local and devolved elections for a period of mourning of a few days.

Voters and voting systems
In England, all residents of the areas covered who are 18 years or over and are a British or Irish citizen, a qualifying Commonwealth citizen, or a citizen of the European Union were eligible to vote. A resident can be registered to vote in two local authorities, such as a student living away from home, and they may vote in both. In Wales, all residents who are 16 years or over and are registered to vote, regardless of citizenship, will be eligible to vote. The deadline to be registered to vote in the May 2021 elections is 11:59pm on 19 April 2021.

Because this wave of local elections incorporates different positions, voters used different voting systems to elect politicians. Councillors were elected using first-past-the-post, meaning that the candidate with the most votes in a ward  was elected. Councils having "all-up" elections had block voting, where voters have a vote for each seat the ward represents and the top candidates are elected. All mayors of England and Police and crime commissioners of England and Wales were elected using the supplementary vote system, where voters select a first and second choice. If no candidate receives 50% of the vote, all except the top two are eliminated. If a voter's first choice candidate is eliminated, and their second choice is for one of the top two, then the second choice is counted.

The Welsh and Scottish parliaments used the additional member system, or AMS. This means voters vote once in a single member constituency and once for party representation in their electoral region. London uses two systems: the Mayor of London is elected using the supplementary vote system while the London Assembly uses AMS.

England
On 13 March 2020, the Government announced that the 2020 elections would be postponed until 2021 in response to growing concerns about the spread of the COVID-19 coronavirus.

County councils 

County councils are elected in full every four years, with the last election having been in 2017. County councils are the upper part of a two-tier system of local government, with the area each covers subdivided into district councils with different responsibilities. These are first-past-the-post elections with a mixture of single-member and multi-member electoral divisions.

There were previously twenty-six county councils, but there will only be twenty-four by the time of the election. Buckinghamshire County Council was replaced with a unitary authority, Buckinghamshire Council, on 1 April 2020. Northamptonshire County Council "declared itself effectively bankrupt" in February 2018 and two new unitary authorities, North Northamptonshire and West Northamptonshire replaced it on 1 April 2021.

In late February 2021 the government confirmed that council elections in Cumbria, North Yorkshire, and Somerset were to be rescheduled for May 2022 because of plans to re-organise the structure of local government in those areas. This meant that council elections for Cumbria County Council, North Yorkshire County Council and Somerset County Council were postponed until the May 2022 local elections.

Metropolitan boroughs 

There are thirty-six metropolitan boroughs, which are single-tier local authorities. Thirty-three of them elect a third of their councillors every year for three years, with no election in each fourth year. These councils hold their elections on the same timetable, and were due to hold an election in 2020 but not in 2021. However, due to the coronavirus pandemic, the May 2020 elections were postponed to May 2021. The remaining three metropolitan boroughs elect their councillors in full every four years. Rotherham Metropolitan Borough Council was due to hold an election for all councillors in May 2020, but this was postponed to 2021. Doncaster Metropolitan Borough Council was due to elect their councillors in 2021. Birmingham City Council holds its elections on a four-year cycle from 2018, so is not due to hold an election until 2022; there were, however, by-elections in 4 wards.

Due to boundary changes, Salford City Council also elected all of its councillors in 2021, and will now be returning to the thirds schedule. The remaining thirty-two metropolitan borough councils that elect their councillors in thirds did so as usual at this election.

Elections for all councillors

Elections for one third of councillors

Unitary authorities 

There were previously fifty-five unitary authorities, but three more were created by the May elections. Buckinghamshire County Council was replaced with a unitary authority, Buckinghamshire Council, on 1 April 2020; the first election to the new unitary authority was scheduled for May 2020, but due to the coronavirus pandemic was rescheduled for May 2021. Subsequent elections are due to be held every four years from 2025. Northamptonshire County Council was replaced with two unitary authorities, North Northamptonshire and West Northamptonshire on 1 April 2021. The first elections to the shadow authorities (temporary council structures before the council formally begins) were planned to be held in May 2020, but due to the coronavirus pandemic have been rescheduled to May 2021. Subsequent elections will be held every four years from 2025.

Of the resulting fifty-eight unitary authorities, thirty elect all their councillors every four years on the cycle from 2019, so are not due to hold elections until 2023. Six elect their councillors every four years and were originally planning to elect in 2021. The three new unitary authorities were scheduled to hold their elections in 2020 and then every four years from 2025, before the 2020 local elections were postponed to 2021. Two unitary authorities were scheduled to elect all their councillors in 2020 but these have also been postponed to 2021. Seventeen unitary authorities elect a third of their councillors every year for three years including 2020 but not 2021, and these elections have been postponed to 2021. Two of these, Halton and Hartlepool, have had boundary changes that mean they are electing all of their councillors in 2021.

Elections for all councillors

Elections for one third of councillors

District councils

62 out of the 182 non-metropolitan district councils held council elections.

Whole district councils
Seven district councils have all of their seats up for election. The seats for Gloucester and Stroud were last up for election in 2016. Basingstoke and Deane, Cambridge, Chorley, Oxford and Pendle have all seats up for election due to ward boundary changes.

Half of councils
Six councils have half of their seats up for election. These seats were last up for election in 2016, and were due to be contested in 2020.

One-third of district councils
Forty-six councils have one-third of their seats up for election. These seats were last up for election in 2016, and were due to be contested in 2020. Elections in Craven, Carlisle and South Lakeland have been postponed due to pending local government reorganisation.  In July 2021 the government announced that these three district councils will be abolished in April 2023.  The postponed elections will therefore not take place, and the councillors elected in 2016 will serve until 2023.

London Assembly 

The London Assembly consists of twenty-five elected members and acts as a scrutiny panel to the mayor. Members are elected using the additional member system, which elects members using both constituencies and a London-wide electoral region.

City of London Corporation 

The Court of Common Council is the main decision-making body of the City of London Corporation, which governs the City of London. The 100 councillors are elected across twenty-five wards. Elections were due on 18 March 2021, but as a result of the coronavirus pandemic were delayed to March 2022.

Council of the Isles of Scilly 
The Council of the Isles of Scilly is the local government authority for the Isles of Scilly. It has sixteen seats, which in the previous 2017 election were all won by independent candidates.

Mayors

Mayor of London 

The Mayor of London is normally elected for four years, although due to the rescheduling of the 2020 election, the election in 2021 will be for a three-year term. The incumbent mayor Sadiq Khan, won re-election with 40.0% of first preference votes, and 55.2% of second preference votes. He will serve until 2024.

Combined authority mayors 

Seven combined authority mayors were up for election.

Single authority mayors 
Five single authority mayors were up for election.

Police and crime commissioner elections

Thirty-five police and crime commissioners in England were up for election, together with four police, fire and crime commissioners.

Wales

Senedd

Elections took place to elect all 60 members of the Senedd (Welsh Parliament), which changed its name from the National Assembly for Wales in 2020. Voting rights were extended to foreign nationals that live in Wales, and residents aged 16 or over.

Police and crime commissioner elections

All four police and crime commissioners in Wales were up for election, to represent the four police force areas of Dyfed-Powys, Gwent, North Wales and South Wales.

Scotland

Elections took place to elect all 129 members of the Scottish Parliament.

UK Parliament by-elections
A by-election for Hartlepool was held on the same day as these local elections.

A by-election for Airdrie and Shotts took place a week later on 13 May.

A by-election for Chesham and Amersham took place on 17 June 2021.

A by-election for Batley and Spen took place on 1 July 2021.

A by-election for Old Bexley and Sidcup took place on 2 December 2021.

A by-election for North Shropshire took place on 16 December 2021.

See also
 2019–2023 structural changes to local government in England
 Absentee voting in the United Kingdom
 Elections in the United Kingdom
 List of political parties in the United Kingdom
 Politics of the United Kingdom

Notes

References

External links

 
United Kingdom local elections
2021 United Kingdom local elections
United Kingdom local elections, 2021